= Greasy Rock Creek =

Stream in Tennessee, U.S.

Coordinates: 36.515922°N 83.214897°W

Greasy Rock Creek is a stream in the U.S. state of Tennessee.

According to tradition, pioneers would lie on a rock while drinking from the creek. The bear grease on the pioneers' clothing would transfer to the rock, hence the name Greasy Rock Creek.
